Muhammad Amir Zikri bin Pauzi (born 17 March 1994) is a Malaysian professional footballer who plays as a midfielder for Ultimate in the Malaysia M3 League.

Amir featured in Malaysia FAM League side Tumpat FA in 2013. However, he was released from the club at the end of the season as Tumpat FA has withdrawn from competition due to financial issue. He later joined Kelantan U21 in 2014.

Club career

Kelantan
Amir played with Kelantan youth team in 2014 until 2015. On 5 December 2015, he has been promoted to first team squad. Amir made his debut for Kelantan's first team in 2–3 win over Penang on 16 August 2016.

Perlis
On 8 January 2017, Amir joined Malaysia Premier League side Perlis on a season-long deal. On 20 January 2017, Amir made his debut for Perlis coming off the bench against ATM in 1–1 draw on the Malaysia Premier League match. He made 17 appearances for Perlis before returned to Kelantan at the end of the 2017 season.

Career statistics

Club

References

External links

Living people
1994 births
People from Kelantan
Malaysian people of Malay descent
Malaysian footballers
Kelantan FA players
Perlis FA players
Tumpat FA players
Malaysia Super League players
Malaysia Premier League players
Association football midfielders